Justice Benson may refer to:

Alfred W. Benson (1843–1916), associate justice of the Kansas Supreme Court
Henry L. Benson (1854–1921), associate justice of the Oregon Supreme Court

See also
Judge Benson (disambiguation)